Agapanthia alexandris is a species of beetle in the family Cerambycidae. It was described by Pic in 1901.

References

alexandris
Beetles described in 1901